Mercedes Rodríguez "Mechi" Lambre (born 5 October 1992) is an Argentine actress, singer, dancer and model. She is known to international audiences for playing the debut role of Ludmilla in the Disney Channel original series Violetta.

Life and career 
Mercedes Lambre was born on 5 October 1992 in La Plata, Province of Buenos Aires, Argentina, where she trained in acting, singing and dancing. She studied theater with Lito Cruz, Gaston Marioni, Augusto Britez, and Alejandro Orduna and is currently studying with Monica Bruni. She also studied voice for four years with Professor Gabriel Giangrante CEFOA Academy in La Plata.

Regarding her training in dance, she majored in jazz dance, street dance and Spanish dances. She studied jazz dance with Juan Mallach for three years and with Gustavo Carrizo; street dance with Daniela Perez for two years in CICLUS and Spanish dances with Analia Flebes Sanchez for three years.

She began her career as a model for pay TV signal Utilísima being Violetta her first appearance in a fiction for television, where she plays Ludmila, the cool and glamorous girl of "Studio 21" which makes her the ideal girlfriend for "Leon" (Jorge Blanco). She starred in the second Violetta's music video, "Juntos somos más", which premiered on 1 May 2012 on Disney Channel.

Filmography

Discography

Singles

As featured artist

Promotional singles

Awards and nominations

References

External links 
 
 

1992 births
Living people
Argentine child actresses
21st-century Argentine women singers
Argentine film actresses
Argentine television actresses
People from La Plata